Sharon Pickering (born 24 June 1967) is a Fijian former swimmer. She competed at the 1984, 1988 and the 1992 Summer Olympics.

References

External links

1967 births
Living people
Fijian female swimmers
Olympic swimmers of Fiji
Swimmers at the 1984 Summer Olympics
Swimmers at the 1988 Summer Olympics
Swimmers at the 1992 Summer Olympics
Commonwealth Games competitors for Fiji
Swimmers at the 1982 Commonwealth Games
Swimmers at the 1986 Commonwealth Games
Place of birth missing (living people)
20th-century Fijian women
21st-century Fijian women